

History  
Viscount of Cardoso da Silva is a Portuguese title of nobility, created by Carlos I of Portugal in the 19th century.

The current claimant to the title is Oliver William Lewis Cardoso da Silva de León (born 3 January 1993), who lives in London, England.

Cardoso da Silva
19th-century establishments in Portugal